The 2007–08 LEB Plata season was the 8th  season of the LEB Plata, second league of the Liga Española de Baloncesto and third division in Spain. It is also named Adecco Plata for sponsorship reasons.

Competition format
18 teams play the regular season. This is a round robin, where each team will play twice against every rival. The champion of the Regular Season is promoted to LEB Oro and the eight next teams join the play-offs. A best-of-three quarterfinal and a Final Four decided the second promoted team.

The last two qualified teams were relegated to LEB Bronce.

If two or more teams have got the same number of winning games, the criteria of tie-breaking are these:
Head-to-head winning games.
Head-to-head points difference.
Total points difference.

Regular season

League table

Playoffs
Teams qualified from 2nd to 9th will play the promotion play-off. If the winner of Copa LEB Plata is qualified between 2nd and 5th at the final of the Regular Season, it will join the play-offs as 2nd qualified. A best-of-three series and a Final Four hosted at Cáceres (with re-seeding) decided who promotes to LEB Oro.

MVP of the regular season
 Stevie Johnson (Alimentos de Palencia)

External links
LEB Plata website in FEB.es

LEB Plata seasons
LEB3